The Saskatchewan Roughriders are a professional Canadian football team based in Regina, Saskatchewan, and are members of the West Division in the Canadian Football League (CFL). The club was founded in 1910 as the Regina Rugby Club and began as a member of the Saskatchewan Rugby Football Union. They were a founding member of the CFL when it was formed in 1958. The current Roughriders head coach is Craig Dickenson, the general manager is Jeremy O'Day, and the current president and chief executive officer for the community-owned team is Craig Reynolds.

Key

Head coaches
Note: Statistics are current through the end of the 2022 CFL season.

Notes
 A running total of the number of coaches of the Roughriders. Thus, any coach who has two or more separate terms as head coach is only counted once.
 Each year is linked to an article about that particular CFL season.

References
General

Specific

Lists of Canadian Football League head coaches by team

Head coaches